{{Taxobox
| color = lightgrey
| name = Candidatus Legionella jeonii| domain = Bacteria
| phylum = Pseudomonadota
| classis = Gammaproteobacteria
| ordo = Legionellales
| familia = Legionellaceae
| genus = Legionella| species = 'Ca. L. jeonii| binomial = Candidatus Legionella jeonii
| binomial_authority = Park et al. 2004
| type_strain = 
| synonyms = 
}}Candidatus Legionella jeonii is a candidatus species of bacteria from the genus Legionella.  Previously known as X-bacterium', Candidatus Legionella jeonii grows symbiotically in Amoeba proteus''. This endosymbiotic relationship was first noticed by Kwang Jeon and Joan Lorch in 1966.

A more recent reference dropped "Candidatus" from its name.

References 

Legionellales
Bacteria described in 2004
Candidatus taxa